Stephan Engels (born 6 September 1960) is a German former professional football player and manager, who played as a midfielder.

In the West German top-flight he scored 39 goals in 236 matches. In 1982-83 Engels won the West German Cup with 1. FC Köln.

After retiring he worked as coach for 1. FC Köln (1995–1996) and SCB Viktoria Köln (2004–2005). In April 2009 he became youth coordinator for 1. FC Köln.

He was a member of the West Germany in the early 1980s. He won 8 caps for West Germany between 1982 and 1983, but did not make an appearance during the 1982 FIFA World Cup.

References

External links
 
 
 

1960 births
Living people
People from Rhein-Sieg-Kreis
Sportspeople from Cologne (region)
Association football midfielders
German footballers
Germany international footballers
Germany B international footballers
Germany under-21 international footballers
1. FC Köln players
1. FC Köln II players
SC Fortuna Köln players
1982 FIFA World Cup players
Bundesliga players
2. Bundesliga players
German football managers
1. FC Köln managers
FC Viktoria Köln managers
Footballers from North Rhine-Westphalia